Salamah College is an independent Islamic co-educational primary and secondary day school, located in Chester Hill, a south-western suburb of Sydney, New South Wales, Australia. The school motto is Education. Faith. Discipline.

Salamah College commenced its first year of K-8 in 2012. However, after expansions the school teaches K-12. The campus features a soccer field, pool, tennis courts and mosque. The campus has over 700 students in both primary and secondary. The school employs more than 100 staff members.  It is co-located with Darulfatwa - Islamic High Council of Australia and radio station 2MFM.

In June 2016 it was reported that student numbers will increase five-fold, and there are approved plans for $27 million extensions for new classrooms, a childcare centre and a sports centre.

Salamah College is a project developed by the Islamic Charity Projects Association (ICPA). ICPA also founded Al Amanah College in Bankstown and Liverpool.

See also

2MFM  
Al Amanah College
Darulfatwa - Islamic High Council of Australia
Islam in Australia
Islamic organisations in Australia
Islamic schools and branches

References

Private primary schools in Sydney
Chester Hill, New South Wales
Educational institutions established in 2012
2012 establishments in Australia
Private secondary schools in Sydney
Islamic schools in Sydney